Marc Pickering is an English stage, film and television actor who appeared in Sleepy Hollow, Calendar Girls, and HBO's Boardwalk Empire.

Early life and education
Pickering was born in Hull, East Riding of Yorkshire. He was first attracted to acting at age eight when he saw an audition sign for The Sound of Music and said to his father "I wouldn't mind doing that." Although he did not get the part, he was keen to get involved, and joined the National Youth Music Theatre. When he was 12, one of the theatre's directors, Jeremy James Taylor, put him forward for the part of Young Masbath in Sleepy Hollow, directed by Tim Burton. He also attended South Hunsley Secondary School.

Career 
Pickering also performed in Bugsy Malone; as the Artful Dodger in Oliver Twist; and in The Long and the Short and the Tall on various London stages before starring opposite Helen Mirren and Julie Walters in Calendar Girls in 2003. He then returned to the stage as Joseph Merrick in The Elephant Man. The production did not use prosthetics, to encourage the audience to see Merrick's struggle and emotions.

Pickering's most significant television role was in Peter Kay's 2008 talent show parody Britain's Got the Pop Factor..., in which he played R Wayne, a role that involved singing and dancing.

Additionally, Pickering plays Montparnasse in Tom Hooper's 2012 reimagining of the celebrated musical Les Misérables.

In 2014, Pickering portrayed Enoch "Nucky" Thompson in his younger years, in the fifth and final season of the HBO television series Boardwalk Empire.

From December 2015 through January 2016, Pickering played Abanazar in Aladdin at the Milton Keynes Theatre. In April and May 2016, he was in the European debut of the rock musical The Toxic Avenger at the Southwark Playhouse, London.

He also had a part as a pizza delivery man in an episode of the third series of the BBC comedy Josh which aired on 6 November 2017. In 2021, he appeared in an episode of the BBC soap opera Doctors as Dixie Calthorpe.

Filmography

Film

Television

References

External links
 

Male actors from Kingston upon Hull
Living people
English male child actors
English male film actors
English male stage actors
English male television actors
Year of birth missing (living people)